Alfred Erwin Günter Friedrich (born 25 January 1943, in Kreuzberg, Berlin) is a German painter, sculpture, multidisciplinary artist. supporting, promoting and spreading art and culture with his Collections. His artworks incorporated materials such as wood, paper, steal, puppets, glass, bronze, cloth, acrylic glass, photography and technological elements, resulting in deep resources which involved audience in a subversive , immersive, and reflective atmosphere. 
He studied with Marcus Lüpertz at the end of the 1960s. His works incorporate materials such as wood, paper, glass, puppets, and bronze, attracted to the technology of QR code, he used it as an artistic element. Friedrich grounded QR Matrix Movement. The operas of Richard Wagner have played a role in developing Fred's theme basing his philosophy which moves Human-being: Faith.

In his entire body of work, Friedrich argues with the past and addresses the concept of believing until now. Themes from Faith are particularly reflected in his work; for instance, the painting Götterdämmerung (oil on canvas) was inspired by Greek mythology and the Old Testament.

His works are often done on a large, confrontational scale and characterised by an unflinching willingness to confront God and believe in Human-being and unrealised potential. It is also characteristic of his work to find symbols and legendary figures or historical places. All of these are encoded which Friedrich seeks to process the past; this has resulted in his work being linked with the New Symbolism and Neo-Expressionism movements. 

Friedrich has lived and worked in Spain since 1997.

Personal life and career 

Friedrich spent his childhood in Wriezen though his city had been heavily bombed a few months before the end of World War II, causing his family to move. Fred Friedrich grew up in a space of just 14 square meters, where he observed the devastated City of Berlin. For living they collected the rubble mined and traded with the scrap. He was dismissed for an alleged lack of appropriation from an early apprenticeship teacher. Friedrich studied craftsman, he worked also in mining underground, road construction and spent a semester at the Berlin University of Arts. His short presence at the academy ended in a "huge fiasco", and he left to continue his studies in the Bauakademie where he studied Architecture and Sculpture, being student of Erich F. Reuter. He received an architecture degree in 1969. Together with George Baselitz, Emanuel Scharfenberg, Fritz Reuter, Gerson Fehrenbach and twelve other artists, Friedrich cofounded the gallery Grossgörschen. Due to the impact of World War II, he was an active member of German student movement 68er.
His first piece, following his ideas focused on the field of painting was in the 1970s, leaving his successful career as an architect. His output during this first creative time is known as Total Abstraction. 
In 1994 he grounded Kunsthaus-Berlin, his first studio.

Artistic process 

Generally, Friedrich attributes traditional mythology, operas, the Bible, and personal reflections as his main subjects and sources of inspiration. In his middle years, his inspiration came from mythology figures, such as the Odyssey. His later work a bronze sculpture called Placebo incorporates themes from Gilgamesh, historical king of the Sumerian city-state of Uruk, and the later Early Dynastic Period. Gilgamesh was worshiped as a god at various locations across Sumer which he combines with others motifs. Cosmogony and Faith are also a large focus in his works. In all, Friedrich searches for the meaning of existence and ″representation of the incomprehensible and the nonrepresentational in Faith, in believe that moves  Human-being ″.

Philosophy 

Friedrich values a spiritual connection with the materials he works with, extracting the spirit that already lives within [them], searching faith and belief that have conceived exceptional discoveries by Human-being. In doing so, he transforms his materials with binder and pigments, mixing manually, resulting in unique colours, among other processes.

He often chooses materials for their alchemical properties- lead in particular. Friedrich´s initial attraction to lead arose when he had made new pieces of art. Eventually, he came to admire its physical and sensory qualities and began to discover more about its connection to Universe. Physically, Friedrich likes handling wood during the process and gathering when he sees many abstract forms, associates to the symbolic idea of a mythology.

Friedrich takes viewers on a journey by fusing fact with fiction, recombining actual imagery into surrealist compositions imbued with engaging dynamism through his saturated colour palette and extraordinary juxtaposition of fantastical forms.
Friedrich's art is an enticing journey full of mystery and enchantment, stating, " The surrounds must be taken, when we hit the stone from the existing mountain or paint on the canvas of our encompass, with all your will and strength, leaving behind your own tracks. Your plan...there is non! We plunge sometimes headless into the unknown."

Work

Painting 

Fred Friedrich is best known for his paintings which have grown increasingly large scale with his particular  mixed-media technique, additions of pigments and alchemy. This results in layers of encrusted surfaces and thick impasto taking viewers on a fantastical 3 dimension escapade.

By 1972, while studying informally for few months under Joseph Beuys at Kunstakademie Düsseldorf his stylistic learnings resembled Wolf Vostell´s approach. He work with metal, glass, straw, puppets, cloth, and machines. The use of these materials meant that his art works became temporary and fragile, as Friedrich himself was well aware; he also wanted to showcase the materials in such a way that they were not disguised and could be represented in their natural form. The fragility of his work contrasts with the stark subject matter in his paintings. The use of familiar materials to express ideas was influences be Beuys, Vostell, who used fat, carpet onces and the other machine, metal the other. It is also typical of the Neo-expressionist style.

Friedrich continue working in the architecture branch and in world art in the years that followed he incorporated Greek mythology in particular, in his work, and in the next decade he studied the Bible, as well as other religions like the Muslim, and Jew. he went on extended journeys throughout Europe, Africa, and the Middle East: the latter two journeys further influenced his work. Besides paintings, Friedrich created sculptures, watercolours, photographs and woodcuts, using wood in particular to create huge format sculptures he reuse repeatedly in all media over the next decades, lending his work its knotty thematic coherence.

Throughout the 1970s and early 1980s, Friedrich made numerous paintings, watercolours, installations on themes interpreted by Richard Wagner in his four-opera cycle Der Ring des Nibelungen (The Ring of the Nibelung).

In the early 1980s, he continues, with his architect career but in the mid-1980s Friedrich´s, in the limited of a restrictive opportunity to create with freedom, he decided at the best of his life architect career to begin with his own philosophy. 
The range of his themes broadened to include references to ancient Hebrew, Muslim and Egyptian history, as in the large painting Götterdämmerung (1998-2018). His paintings of the 1990s. in particular explore the universal myths of existence and meaning. So he moulded his new style and start Friedrich and associated with the avant-garde movement that, setting off, "Abstract Expressionism" and with big movements of his body places his artworks on the ground creating parallel worlds. His works happen for several phases, with the call "under cover painting" and this way he declares "...over there take unchangeable places and unstoppable dimensions of time that they are frozen on the linen".
Over the past decade, the photographs that Friedrich took in Africa ″reverberated″ in his mind to suggest a vast array of cultural and historical references, reaching from the first human civilisation of Mesopotamia to the actual human new 3 digital technology.

Over the years Friedrich has made many unusual works, but one work stands out among the rest as particularly bizarre- that work being his Götterdämmerung. In 1997, after twenty years of working in Götterdämmerung, the artist left Germany to travel around the world—to Africa, Mexico, China, Thailand, Indonesia, Australia, and Egypt. Taking 20 years to create this piece which icons, and produce a speech that begins even with the right other the left hand, they are Children of Jerusalem, both hanged by an enormous octopus, while the speech continues you can reach many episodes from Bible and Greek mythology, in the middle of the triptych it is a big head stand for Human-being, which they have the key for the future, behind the big head are two open doors: it is the future. He asked Italian art critic, Augusto de Marchiani to write a text for the catalog about the future of Human-being, finding it entire unique.

Sculpture 

After working in several medias and workshops, Friedrich´s began developing the revolutionary style for which he is known. His abstraction as he turned his thoughts towards experimentation with the elements of design. Friedrich´s earlier abstract figures deal principally with cut figures in mass, while his later ones contrasts the solid elements of the sculpture with the space, under the influence of the Toltec-Mayan figure. This later, more abstract heads, by which Friedrich explores and alternates concave and convex shapes. 
Friedrich´s sculptures made many preparatory sketches and drawings for each sculpture. Most of these sketchbooks and photomontage are in collection at Museo Fred Friedrich. He placed great importance on drawing, taking photo shoots which he analysed  light, form and colour of each sculpture. Friedrich built up a collection of natural objects; skulls, rocks, metals, wood, which he would use to provide inspiration for organic forms. For his largest works, he usually produced a half-scale, working model before scaling up for the final moulding and casing at a bronze foundry. Friedrich often refined the final full plaster shape and directed the patina with a team and himself.

List of Works 

He created several collections which are exhibited in several museum around the world. 
 ″Fin de Ciel″ with more than forty paintings, thirty bronze sculpture that refer in their titles inscription to the Popol Vuh text recounting the mythology and history of the Kʼicheʼ people, one of the Maya peoples, who inhabit Guatemala and the Mexican states of Chiapas, Campeche, Yucatan and Quintana Roo, as well as areas of Belize and Honduras. 
By the mid-1980s. Friedrich´s theme widened from a focus on Religion´s role in civilisation to the fate of art and culture in general. His work became more sculptural and involved not only one religion, but also occult symbolism, theology and mysticism. The theme of all the work is the trauma experienced by entire societies, and the continual rebirth and renewal in life. Friedrich with his darwinists ideas affirms: "The essential cause to maintain my position is based principally that I think that coincidences do not exist in life, everything is precise", with this statement his ambitious work began spanning decades.

  Siete Hijas de Eva 
  Teotihuacan
  Chichen Itza
  Kopf-los inspired by Ancient Maya Civilisation culture he created a round 40 bronze head sculptures. One becomes an explorer mining through dazzling fields of opulent vision overflowing with imagery reminiscent of exotic lands. 
  Cuadros Negros
  Hijos del Sol 
  Tzolkin
  Mana 
 Exodus
 Cuadros azules
 Placebo

From 1994 to 2003, he produced different sizes painting about the cosmos. He also started to turn to sculpture, although lead still remains his preferred medium as a powerful sculptor, shows he is truly multidisciplinary artist. Each biomorphic bronze sculpture holds the name of a Mayan God, instilling in his art the timeless prestige, power and omnipresence of the Mayan Civilisation.
The works recurrent colour are green, blue, yellow like nature, each collection is created in several works at the same time, resulting each work one-of-a-kind, giving a rough and slathered surface with paint, plaster, epoxy, abstract figures, lines and forms which the audience is free for interpretation.

QR Matrixsum 

Friedrich go over how media digital work be operational, using the QR code as an artistic element. Grounded the QR Matrix Movement, (2009-2022),  expecting a total viewing experience, connecting digital era,  photography, video, painting and sculpture.  

A series of photography featuring video motifs with a spectral media collage  which saturated hues with dynamically energises lines make  these designed compositions an interaction result with the audience. Link with a combination of several components attributing a complex piece of art. 

Fusing imagery, real and abstract to limit the distance between conscious reality and unconscious imagination translated into a storytelling experience, so  Friedrich ambition is being an accomplished digital artist thought  the collection  QR Matrix postulated  cataclysm in faith always happen.  

Just with a simple camera mode status viewer is introduces into an immersive world.

Exhibitions 

In 1998 with the collaboration of the prestigious Museum in Cologne Germany, the Museum Ludwig mounted together a retrospective where Cuba culture expresses  ideas and philosophy about his culture and political position.  

The multidisciplinary artist satisfies the most demanding criteria of the German and world culture. He performed exhibitions, along with Helmut Schober, in the Angel Orensanz Center New York City showing up his Darwinian and pantheism convictions, where he used the 4th. postulate to declare "... the ascending world harmony and all living beings exist. just during the natural selection, in Nature nothing is arbitrary and random and all has an order that demands a project". With his trajectory and collaboration of the Israel Municipality in Berlin, together celebrated the Fiftieth anniversary of Israel birth, standing out the exhibition Position Israel at Museo Fred Friedrich, during this exhibition were more than 18 Israelis artists, showing out the oppressed and relegated cultures and the recurrent impact on our society. 

Museo-Casa Diego Rivera and Museo Jumex mounted several exhibition where Mexico critics where astonished about the artworks. Exhibitions in Marbella, Spain, at prestigious Museum Cortijo de Miraflores, where  sustaining Fin de Ciel  exhibited one of the Collection called Hijos del Sol philosophy and maya culture about December 2012 marked the conclusion of a bʼakʼtun—a time period in the Mesoamerican Long Count calendar, used in Central America prior to the arrival of Europeans. Although the Long Count was most likely invented by the Olmec, that is the last Maya 2012 year where drama,  chaos, reaction, and all changeable forms are involved in an inherent mystic fractal of the future.

At present time bronze sculpture Ixbalanque is exhibited at Museo Whitney New York City in Chelsea. 

The promotion and contribution supporting more artists of any gender, status, religion, color is shown out in exhibitions Serie Museo belongs to All, meaning a serie of several exhibitions at Museo Fred Friedrich.

Recognition 

This award-winning artist is one of the first Digital Artist of the moment and has had exhibited internationally, showcasing his art in solo and group exhibitions in Italy, Spain, Portugal, Ireland, England, India, (Germany), Mexico and United States.

During his trajectory Fred Friedrich has appeared in various stages and awards like the Bienal Portugal with an impressive installation called Zyklon B, underlining in early 1942, the Nazis  Zyklon B as the preferred killing tool in extermination camps during the Holocaust they used it to murder roughly 1.1 million people in gas chambers at Auschwitz-Birkenau, Majdanek, and elsewhere. Friedrich an allusion to this horror with an installation. 

Premio de Pintura Focus- Abengoa in Sevilla, in Bienal del Milenio in Granada, The Open West in Gloucester Cathedral, in Art Prize laguna 2012 in Venice, in Premios Iberoamericanos Cortés de Cádiz and on the Royal Academy of Arts with the first QR Matrix Movement artwork "Madonna QR", who won the appreciation of the hard English critic and also of many other more spaces.

Museo Fred Friedrich helps to preserve his legacy by supporting artists with dynamic exhibitions, its goal is to develop appreciation for visual arts. The Museo was established by Fred and his family in 2010 in Spain, and still working.

See also 
 QR code
 List of German painters
 Postmodern
 Neoexpressionism
 Abstract expressionism
 Sculpture
 Action Painting
 Digital art
 Avant-garde

References

External links 
 http://www.museo-fredfriedrich.com
 http://www.arteinformado.com/guia/f/fred-friedrich-21439
 http://www.artnet.com/artists/fred-friedrich/biography
 https://web.archive.org/web/20110713175156/http://www.kyra-maralt.com/Friedrich1.htm
 http://www.onlineviewingroom.com/?s=200+Years+vs.+10+Years
 http://www.malagalibertad.com/cultura/2531-exposicon
 https://www.youtube.com/user/fredfriedrich

20th-century German painters
20th-century German male artists
German male painters
21st-century German painters
21st-century German male artists
Living people
People from Friedrichshain-Kreuzberg
Artists from Berlin
1943 births